Saidapet, also known as Saidai, is a neighbourhood in Chennai, India, situated in the northern banks of the Adyar River and serves as an entry point to Central Chennai. It is surrounded by West Mambalam in the North, C.I.T Nagar in the North-East, Nandanam in the East, Guindy in the South, Jafferkhanpet and Ashok Nagar in the North-West. The Saidapet Court, the only other court of judicature in Chennai city apart from the Madras High Court, and the Saidapet bus depot are located here. Prior to its incorporation in Madras city, Saidapet functioned as the administrative headquarters of Chingleput district. The neighbourhood is served by Saidapet railway station of the Chennai Suburban Railway Network.

Saidapet was occupied by the British East India Company and was made the administrative headquarters of Chingleput district. The health district in Chengalpet district is split into Saidapet hud and Kanchipuram hud. Panagal building which is a part of Saidapet is a famous landmark.

History 

The Maraimalai Adigal Bridge (previously the Marmalong Bridge) connects the northern banks of the Adyar river with the south. This bridge was originally built in 1726 by Coja Petrus Uscan. The dilapidated old bridge was replaced by a new one in the 1960s built as part of the reconstruction and modernization efforts.

Saidapet was obtained by the British East India Company in the 1700s along with the jaghir of Chingleput. From 1859 to 1947, Saidapet served as the district headquarters of Chingleput District. In 1947, the headquarters was shifted to Chengalpattu. Saidapet was included in Madras city during 1945-46 and since then forms a part of the corporation. Saidapet had a large weaver population and handlooms were in operation as late as 1990. It was also quite notorious for filariasis back in the olden days.

Religion
There are several temples, churches and mosque in the area.

Temples

Karaneeswarar temple
This temple is located next to the Saidapet Railway station. This temple has a 7-storied Gopuram with two prakarams (closed precincts of a temple). The main deity is Lord Karaneeswara and Goddess Swarnaambikai. This temple has a beautiful tank. The temple is heavily crowded on Pradhosham days. Annual ten-day Brahmotsavam takes place in the Tamil month of Chithirai. During Chitirai thirvizha, people visit the temple in huge numbers and there will be a daily spiritual talk on Thiruvasagam about Lord Shiva.

Prasanna Venkatesa Perumal kovil

According to an old inscription, the Prasanna Venkatesa Perumal temple was constructed in the 12th century. It is popularly known as Perumal Kovil of Saidapet. The main deity is Prasanna Venkatesa Perumal. Annual Brahmotsavam takes place during the Tamil month of Chithirai. Vaikunta Ekadasi festival is very famous here. Other two famous festivals are Rathasapthami held in the month of February and Thotta Urchavam held in the month of march. One more important function in this temple is that Sri Parthasarathy Swamy of Triplicane visits this temple yearly once on the first Sunday of February.

Anjaneyar temple 
This Hanuman temple is situated on the banks of the Adyar river which is said to be a 1000 year old temple. There is one more Anjaneyar temple facing the Prasanna Venkatesa Perumal kovil. It is said the Hanuman in this temple is incarnated in such a way that he is worshipping Lord Rama situated at the Narasimha temple.

Soundareswarar temple 
This temple is situated in the centre of Saidapet, near to the newly constructed Market Subway which links to the Anna Salai and Alandur.  Its main deity is Lord Soundareswarar and Lord Thirupurasundari. Lord Varasithi Vinayar facing West is a famous one. The Stala Virutcham is Vanni Maram and is being worshipped on Saturdays by the devotees of Saidapet, Mambalam, K K Nagar, Velacherry etc. The temple is also known as Vada Thirunaraiyur. Vanni, Vilvam and Konrai, the three trees are known for Shiva's worship, are available in this temple. Leaves of Vanni maram is used for the archana for Saneesvaran. Annual brahmotsavam take place in the month of Ani and the deity is taken in processing for 10 days. This Temples comes under HR&CE control.  Last Kumbabizhegam was performed in 1988 by the temple Sivachariar Late.C.K.Krishnamurthy Gurukkal.

The temple is further renovated and a Kumbabhizegam was performed on 11 March 2012 with the support temple devotees.

Churches
Saidapet has about seven churches, Our Lady of Good Health church has a congregation of 1000 families and is situated on LDG street, the NLAG Church is situated across the bridge. It is the biggest Assembly of God church in Tamil Nadu. C.S.I Church of Jesus the Savior located in prime location in Saidapet was congregated in 1902 and one among the oldest congregation in Chennai. C.S.I St. Thomas Church located in Saidapet is 85 years old with 400 families as its members. It was re-constructed in 2012.

Little Mount Church
A few meters south of the Maraimalai Adigalar Bridge is the hill formation called Little Mount. On top of this mountain is a church dedicated to Our Lady of Good Health. The original church was built by the Portuguese in 1551 AD. The new church was built after demolishing a part of old church in the 1970s. According to history - 'St. Thomas the Apostle' lived in a cave under the Church, which is well preserved even today. The Church holds an annual festival in honor of Our Lady on the fifth Saturday of Easter. Recently, this Church was elevated to the status of a Shrine.

Transportation

Railway station
The suburban railway station in Saidapet is located between the stations of Guindy and Mambalam. It is easily accessible from the main road. Recently, automatic ticket vending machines have been introduced here.

Buses

Saidapet has a MTC bus terminus located on Anna Salai. There are frequent bus services originating from this place to other important parts of the city and outskirts. Many buses also pass through this area and offer excellent connectivity to various places and West Saidapet has a MTC bus terminus located on West Jones Road.

Metro Rail
Saidpet has a Metro station and the first phase of Chennai metro was inaugurated in 2019. The station has bus terminus nearby and connects to all the southern destination in the city. The only complaint it has been built so far away from the actual Saidapet. Still it serves adjacent areas.

Bridges 
 The bridge located near the market on Jeenis road serves as a vital link to Mount Road from West Saidapet.
 Jones Road underpass serves an important link for West Saidapet and Jaffarkhanpet.
 Aranganathan subway serves to connect Ashok Nagar and Mambalam.
 Alandhur bridge to connect Guindy Industrial Estate and West Saidapet, it helps to by-pass Guindy Katipara bridge to reach Mount road from 100 Feet road.

Important places

Saidapet has a very busy shopping market place called the Bazaar Road. It is famous for its fish and meat market attracting buyers from faraway places.

Educational institutions

Schools
Alpha Matriculation Higher Secondary School 
St. Mary's Higher Secondary School
Fathima Matriculation Higher Secondary School
Corporation Boys Higher Secondary School (primitively named as Manthoppu School, since the place was a mango groove which belonged to the temple)
Girls Higher Secondary School respectively (primitively named as Manthoppu School, since the place was a mango groove which belonged to the temple)
Annai Veilankanni's Matriculation Higher Secondary School
 Thiruvalluvar Gurukalam Secondary School
 Government Model Higher Secondary School
Geetha Matriculation Higher Secondary School
Cambridge Matriculation Higher Secondary School

Colleges
The most familiar college in Saidapet is the Teachers Training College.

Tamilnadu Open University which is the latest university for distance education has established.

Annai Veilankanni's College for Woman is there in Saidapet

Familiar Anna University in Guindy and Government Arts College in Nandanam are closely located to Saidapet.

Community halls

St. Thomas Community Hall

This hall is located opposite Our Lady of Good Health church and is run by the church officials. The hall in the first floor has a capacity of about 250 people and the dining hall on the ground floor can seat about 70 people. Car parking is inadequate inside the compound. Cars are usually parked outside the compound in the land belonging to church.

Politics
Saidapet assembly constituency is part of Chennai South (Lok Sabha constituency).
It occupies an important place in Tamil Nadu politics being the starting place for election rallies. Karunanidhi was once elected from this constituency.

Location in context

External links 
 http://www.fallingrain.com/world/IN/25/Saidapet.html
 
 http://www.saidaimart.com

References

 

Neighbourhoods in Chennai
Suburbs of Chennai
Cities and towns in Chennai district